Ramjee Kunwar (born 19 September 1956; Kaski District, Nepal) is a Nepal Trade Union Congress-Independent (NTUCI) leader, Senior Vice President of NTUCI and executive member of Nepali Congress Party. He was also the former vice president and secretary of NTUCI and is currently acting president.

NTUCI is a major democratic national center of Nepal, established in 1947. The labor movement in Nepal started on March 4, 1947, in Biratnagar against the hereditary Rana rule for the establishment of democracy and advancement of workers’ rights. In 1948, Girija Prasad Koirala founded the Nepal Mazdoor Congress, later known as the Nepal Trade Union Congress-Independent. NTUCI also actively agitated and protested in the 2006 democracy movement in Nepal against the direct and undemocratic rule of King Gyanendra of Nepal. Many trade union leaders along with Kunwar were put in jail and some fled to India. The ideology of NTUCI was based on democracy, nationalism and socialism. NTUCI is affiliated with the International Trade Union Confederation (ITUC) and the International Labour Organization.

Early involvement
Kunwar received his education from Gandhigram Rural University, Tamil Nadu, India in 1984. He worked in the health sector for 22 years. He joined the trade union in 1990 and has continuously fought for the cause of labour. Kunwar joined the trade union because of discrimination against worker's rights, welfare, and socio-economic standards. He flayed the provision of 'no work no pay' in the new policy, saying it was against the labourers. "The provision is totally against the laborers and we condemn it," Kunwar said.

Activities
Under his leadership, NTUCI has been actively campaigning to promote social welfare, social justice, human rights, and equality and to eliminate child labor on a national level. Kunwar was also part of the Nepalese delegation to the 98th International Labour Conference (ILC) with (ILO) whom briefed Director General of ILO,  Juan Somavia on their efforts to have labour-related rights incorporated into the new constitution at Geneva, in 2009. Kunwar has actively lobbied and put pressure on political parties and government with the partnership of other trade unions. They have succeeded in addressing workers' rights and job security in the interim constitution of Nepal and in the ratification of ILO conventions.  He addressed the high-level meeting with the World Bank, International Monetary Fund (IMF) and ITUC/Global Unions in Washington, DC in January 2011.

Minimum wage
Kunwar is also one of the key people from Joint Trade Union negotiating the minimum wage for workers. After many negotiations and disagreements, in a landmark decision trade unions and employers have agreed to increase the salary and daily wages of workers. Talks between the Federation of Nepalese Chambers of Commerce and Industry, Confederation of Nepalese Industries and trade unions have resulted in hiking the minimum wage of workers from Rs 4,600 to Rs 6,100 and bringing in a social security plan for workers. The agreement also provides for amending labour laws in favour of industrial harmony. "Trade unions have taken the agreement positive as the agreement has accepted their longtime demand of Social security. Including Social security fund in the agreement is the success of labour movement", said Ramjee Kunwar, acting president of NTUCI.

References

External links
 Nepal Trade Union Congress Independent

1956 births
Living people
Nepalese trade unionists
Nepali Congress politicians from Gandaki Province
International Trade Union Confederation
People from Pokhara
Khas people